The 1993 Delaware Fightin' Blue Hens football team represented the University of Delaware as a member of the Mid-Atlantic Division of the Yankee Conference during the 1993 NCAA Division I-AA football season. Led by 28th-year head coach Tubby Raymond, the Fightin' Blue Hens compiled an overall record of 9–4 with a mark of 6–2 in conference play, placing second in the Yankee Conference's Mid-Atlantic Division. For the third consecutive season, Delaware advanced to the NCAA Division I-AA Football Championship playoffs, where the Fightin' Blue Hens beat Montana in the first round before for losing to the eventual national runner-up, Marshall, in the quarterfinals. The team played home games at Delaware Stadium in Newark, Delaware.

Schedule

Roster

References

Delaware
Delaware Fightin' Blue Hens football seasons
Delaware Fightin' Blue Hens football